Tommy Johansson (born 21 October 1950) is a former speedway rider from Sweden.

Speedway career 
Johansson is a former champion of Sweden, winning the Swedish Championship in 1973. He reached the final of the Speedway World Championship during the 1974 Individual Speedway World Championship and the final of the 1971 Individual Ice Speedway World Championship.

He rode in the top tier of British Speedway from 1971 until 1975, riding for various clubs.

World Final Appearances

Individual World Championship
 1974 -  Göteborg, Ullevi - 7th - 8pts

Individual Ice Speedway World Championship
1971 –  Inzell, 15th – 4pts

References 

1950 births
Living people
Swedish speedway riders
Hull Vikings riders
Ipswich Witches riders
Newport Wasps riders